George Victor Robert John Innes-Ker, 9th Duke of Roxburghe (7 September 1913 – 26 September 1974) was the son of Henry John Innes-Ker, 8th Duke of Roxburghe and Mary Goelet.  He succeeded his father in 1932.

Early life
George Victor Robert John Innes-Ker was born on 7 September 1913 to Henry Innes-Ker, 8th Duke of Roxburghe (1876–1932) and Mary Goelet (1878–1937). He was born almost ten years after his parents were married, on 10 November 1903,

He grew up at Floors Castle which was located on 60,500 acres, which his mother decorated with her own collection of art including a series of 17th century Gobelins Manufactory tapestries.

Family
His paternal grandparents were James Henry Robert Innes-Ker, 7th Duke of Roxburghe (1839–1892) and Lady Anne Emily Spencer-Churchill (1854–1923), the fourth daughter of John Spencer-Churchill, 7th Duke of Marlborough, who served in Conservative governments as Lord President of the Council and Lord Lieutenant of Ireland, and his wife, Lady Frances Vane, daughter of the 3rd Marquess of Londonderry.  His first cousin once removed was Winston Churchill. His uncle, Lord Robert Edward Innes-Ker (1885–1958), married the actress Jose Collins.

His maternal grandfather was Ogden Goelet (1851–1897), an American real-estate millionaire. At the time of his parents' marriage, his mother was the wealthiest American heiress, with a dowry of twenty million dollars, exceeded only by Consuelo Vanderbilt. He also was a grandnephew of Mrs. Cornelius Vanderbilt III, née Grace Wilson.

Personal life

The Duke attended Eton College in Windsor, Berkshire, England.

On 24 October 1935, he was married to Lady Mary Evelyn Hungerford Crewe-Milnes (1915–2014), daughter of Robert Crewe-Milnes, 1st Marquess of Crewe, by his marriage to Lady Margaret Etrenne Hannah Primrose, daughter of Hannah Primrose, Countess of Rosebery, and Archibald Primrose, 5th Earl of Rosebery. The marriage ended in divorce in 1953, after the Duke controversially attempted to evict Lady Mary from the ancestral home at Floors Castle. When her widowed mother died in 1967, the Duchess inherited West Horsley Place where she died in 2014 at the age of 99.

On 5 January 1954, he married for the second time at Caxton Hall to Margaret Elizabeth McConnel (1918–1993), daughter of Capt. Frederick Bradshaw McConnel and great-granddaughter of British industrialist William McConnel. Together, they had:
 Guy David Innes-Ker, 10th Duke of Roxburghe (18 November 1954 – 29 August 2019)
 Lord Robert Anthony Innes-Ker (b. 28 May 1959) married 1996 (separated) Katherine Pelly, and has issue, one son and one daughter.

The 9th Duke of Roxburghe died on 26 September 1974.

Ancestry

References

1913 births
1974 deaths
9
Goelet family
Scottish people of American descent